Faustina is a 1957 Spanish comedy film directed by José Luis Sáenz de Heredia. It was entered into the 1957 Cannes Film Festival.

Plot 
A demon is required to make a pact with an old woman with a stormy past who wishes to return to youth. Mogón is a condemned man who committed suicide for that woman who was the cause of his losing his soul and being in hell.

Cast
 María Félix as Faustina
 Fernando Fernán Gómez as Mogon
 Conrado San Martín as Capitán Batler
 Fernando Rey as Valentín
 Elisa Montés as Elena
 José Isbert as Cura
 Juan de Landa as Mefistófeles
 Tony Leblanc as Novio
 Tomás Blanco as Dueño del cabaret
 Xan das Bolas as Limpio
 Santiago Ontañón as Don Fernando
 Rafael Bardem as Jurado (as Rafael Barden)

References

External links

1957 films
1957 comedy-drama films
1957 comedy films
1957 drama films
1950s Spanish-language films
Films based on Goethe's Faust
Films directed by José Luis Sáenz de Heredia
Works based on the Faust legend
Spanish comedy-drama films
1950s Spanish films